Vyacheslav Anatolyevich Kamoltsev (born 14 December 1971) is a Russian professional football coach and a former player.

Club career
He made his professional debut in the Soviet Second League in 1988 for FC Torpedo Kurgan.

Honours
 Russian Premier League bronze: 2000.
 Russian First Division top scorer: 1993 (Zone East, 22 goals), 2002 (20 goals).
 Russian Premier League Cup finalist: 2003.

European club competitions
With FC Torpedo Moscow.

 UEFA Cup 1996–97: 3 games, 1 goal.
 UEFA Intertoto Cup 1997: 6 games, 1 goal.
 UEFA Cup 2000–01: 1 game.
 UEFA Cup 2001–02: 1 game.

References

1971 births
Living people
People from Kurgan, Kurgan Oblast
Russian footballers
Association football forwards
Russian expatriate footballers
Expatriate footballers in Turkey
FC Tobol Kurgan players
FC Tyumen players
FC Torpedo Moscow players
FC Torpedo-2 players
Kocaelispor footballers
FC Chernomorets Novorossiysk players
FC Oryol players
Russian Premier League players
Soviet footballers
Russian football managers
Sportspeople from Kurgan Oblast